Melora Harte is an American voice actress. In addition to voice acting in anime, she also adapted and directed several anime dubs. Her husband, Steve Kramer, is also a voice actor.

Filmography

Voice roles 
Akira - Kiyoko (Streamline dub), Additional Voices (Streamline and Geneon dubs)
Buso Renkin - Chisato Wakamiya
Cowboy Bebop - Additional Voices
Cyborg 009 - Cyborg 0012
Dirty Pair - Spaceport Announcement Voice
El-Hazard - Afura Mann
Fighting Spirit - Various
Flint the Time Detective - Various
Gankutsuou: The Count of Monte Cristo - Various
Geneshaft - Lisa, Anne, Kei
Gestalt - Carmine
Hello Kitty's Paradise - Various
Honeybee Hutch - Various
Jin Jin and the Panda Patrol - Various
Kyo Kara Maoh! - Gloria, Norika
The Little Polar Bear - Additional Voices
Macross Plus - Sharon Apple
Maple Town - Various
Megazone 23 - Cindy (International Dub)
Nightwalker - Miharu Akiba
Noozles - Additional Voices
Pilot Candidate - Teela Zain Elmes, Narrator
Power Rangers Zeo - Archerina (uncredited)
Paranoia Agent - Old Woman
Robotech - Musica
Saint Tail - Mother (Eimi Haneoka) – also Co-Director
Silent Möbius - Rally Cheyenne
Space Adventure Cobra - Various
Tenchi Muyo! Ryo-Ohki OVA 3 and Tenchi Muyo! GXP - Seto Kamiki Jurai
Twilight of the Dark Master - Additional Voices
Wicked City - Soap Girl (Streamline Dub)
Willy Fog 2 - Princess Romy
Wisdom of the Gnomes - Various
Zorro the Chronicles

Live-Action 
Attack of the 5 Ft. 2 In. Women - Tonya's Coach
Dante's Cove - Kevin's Mother
Doctor Duck's Super Secret All-Purpose Sauce - Herself
Highway to Heaven - Waitress
It's Always Sunny in Philadelphia - Woman (Suburban House)
Waiting to Act - Waitress

Video games
Inherit the Earth: Quest for the Orb - Various
Might and Magic: World of Xeen - Various
Might and Magic VII: For Blood and Honor - Various
Robotech: Battlecry - Helena Chase
Star Trek: Judgment Rites - Maria, Pupil, Console, Moll

Staff credits 
Bobobo-bo Bo-bobo - Adaptation
Requiem from the Darkness - Adaptation
The Wisdom of The Gnomes - Adaptation, Writer
Gatchaman 94 OVA - Casting Director
Honeybee Hutch - Writer, Voice Director
Geneshaft - ADR Script
Saint Tail - Co-Director
Tenchi in Tokyo - Writer
Vampire Princess Miyu TV - Writer
Jungle Tales - Writer
Grimm's Fairy Tale Classics - Writer
Sandokan - Writer
Ox Tales - Writer
Wowser - Writer
The Littl' Bits - Writer
Samurai Pizza Cats - Writer
Bob in a Bottle - Writer
Maya the Bee - Writer
Noozles - Writer
Iznogoud - Writer
Gulliver's Travels - Writer
Jin Jin and the Panda Patrol - Writer
Mighty Morphin' Power Rangers - Writer
Saban's Adventures of Peter Pan - Writer
Saban's Adventures of Pinocchio - Writer
Saban's Adventures of the Little Mermaid - Writer
Around the World in Eighty Dreams - Writer
The Secret Files of the Spy Dogs - Writer
Big Bad Beetleborgs - Writer
Digimon Adventure - Writer
VR Troopers - Writer
Flint the Time Detective - Writer
Sailor Moon S - Writer (Viz Media dub)
Gatchaman - Casting Director
DNA Sights 999.9 - Talent Coordinator
Hurricane Polymar - Talent Coordinator
Angel Tales - Talent Coordinator
Shinzo - Talent Coordinator
When in Rome - Loup Group Coordinator
The Twilight of the Golds - ADR Loop Group
Nice Guys Sleep Alone - ADR Loop Group

References

External links
Melora Harte at the English Voice Actor & Production Staff Database

Living people
American voice actresses
American television writers
American women screenwriters
American women television writers
American casting directors
Women casting directors
American voice directors
Robotech cast and crew
Year of birth missing (living people)